Ken Luttrell (born August 13, 1953) is an American politician who has served in the Oklahoma House of Representatives from the 37th district from 2006 to 2010 and since 2018.  Luttrell is a citizen of the Cherokee Nation and co-chaired the House's Native American Caucus in 2020.

References

1953 births
21st-century Native American politicians
Living people
Cherokee Nation state legislators in Oklahoma
Cherokee Nation politicians
Republican Party members of the Oklahoma House of Representatives
Democratic Party members of the Oklahoma House of Representatives
21st-century American politicians
American politicians who switched parties